Ruth Parriott is the former CEO of the Twin Cities Medical Society. Prior to her appointment she was a representative of the American Cancer Society's Tobacco Tax Policy Project and held positions at the Neighborhood Health Care Network and The Minneapolis Foundation. She is a graduate of Hamline University and the University of Minnesota.

References

20th-century births
Living people
Hamline University alumni
University of Minnesota alumni
American Cancer Society people
Year of birth missing (living people)
Women chief executives